The Peter and Isabelle McCulloch McQuie Milkhouse is a historic building located on a farm southwest of Earlham, Iowa, United States. The McQuies were natives of Scotland who immigrated to the US in 1857, and settled in Madison County in 1871. This building is an early example of a vernacular limestone farm building. The single-story structure is composed of ashlar and rubble stone that might have been quarried at Parkins Quarry in Madison Township. Two-thirds of the building housed the milkhouse. The other third was separated from the milkhouse by a stone wall, and may have housed a hired man. The building was listed on the National Register of Historic Places in 1987.

References

Infrastructure completed in 1875
Vernacular architecture in Iowa
Buildings and structures in Madison County, Iowa
National Register of Historic Places in Madison County, Iowa
Agricultural buildings and structures on the National Register of Historic Places in Iowa
1875 establishments in Iowa